Available Light is a 2005 album by New Zealand singer-songwriter Dave Dobbyn. It debuted at number 3 on the New Zealand Music Charts.

Track listing

DVD
The album was also released with a limited edition DVD. The contents of the DVD are:

Available Light - Album Insight
Fans on Film
Dave's Track by Track
Behind the scenes of the Welcome Home video
Welcome Home video (with optional director's commentary)
Haere Mai Dave

In addition, the DVD contains a hidden "Easter Egg", accessed by scrolling up on the main menu and pressing enter.

References

External links
 Track-by-Track Explanations (davedobbyn.co.nz)

Dave Dobbyn albums
2005 albums
Sony BMG albums